Vaszilisz Teodoru (born 22 August 1962) is a Hungarian football manager and former player of Greek descent, who is an assistant coach of MTK Budapest FC.

Managerial career
On 3 February 2016, Teodoru was appointed as the manager of the Nemzeti Bajnokság I club MTK Budapest FC.

Managerial statistics

References

1962 births
Living people
Hungarian football managers
Hungarian people of Greek descent
Nemzeti Bajnokság I managers
MTK Budapest FC managers